"When The Boat Comes In" (or "Dance Ti Thy Daddy") is a traditional English language folk song, listed as 2439 in the Roud Folk Song Index. The popular version originates in North East England. An early source for the lyrics, Joseph Robson's "Songs of the bards of the Tyne", published 1849, can be found on the FARNE archive.  In FARNE's notes to the song, it is stated that the lyrics were written by William Watson in about 1826.

It was popularised as the theme tune of the 1970s BBC drama serial When The Boat Comes In, in an arrangement by the composer David Fanshawe.

Lyrics
There are two distinct sets of lyrics in popular culture for the song. The theme of the TV series of the same name, sung by Alex Glasgow, was released as a BBC single and uses the traditional lyrics. The songs represent a boy waiting for the boat to come in, dancing to his father, singing to his mother, eating a fish.  The non-traditional lyrics describe him doing things while he ages: first singing and playing, next farming, finds a girl, becomes a father to a son, and sings to him of all he's done. This version was also used in a TV advertisement for Young's Seafood "Sea to Plate" campaign, and used the same lyrics as The Wiggles. The lyrics of the traditional version of the song, used in the TV series theme, differ significantly from those of the TV advertisement, talking of drinking alcohol.

Other traditional versions 
Jean Ritchie of Kentucky and Elizabeth Cronin of West Cork, Ireland were recorded by Alan Lomax on separate occasions singing versions of the song; Cronin's version can be heard online. Belle Stewart sang a version in Scottish Cant and English/Scots, which is available on the Tobar an Dualchais website.

References

External links
 Lyrics printed on inside cover of BBC DVD series released by Acorn Media
 Music sheet
 Traditional version of the song

English folk songs
Songs about fish
Songs about fishers
Songs about boats
Year of song unknown